(literally "grilled spring rolls") is Vietnamese grilled pork sausage or grilled meatballs, and a popular Vietnamese food item, sometimes served as an individual appetizer or snack, or served with rice noodles or rice as a main course.  is a specialty of  Province.

Nem nướng is a rustic dish, originating from Ninh Hoa, a northern district of Khanh Hoa province, about 30 km from the coastal city.

Ingredients and cooking method
 is made of ground pork with between a third and a half pork fat. The meat is typically flavoured with chopped shallots, crushed garlic, fish sauce, sugar and black pepper.

It is formed into sausages or meatballs and then grilled or baked.

Serving
 can be eaten alone as an appetizer or snack, and dipped in  ["dipping sauce"], or with a peanut dip.  is fish sauce diluted with water and flavored with sugar, lime juice, chopped raw garlic, chopped fresh bird's eye chili (Thai chili)/cayenne pepper, and sometimes with vinegar. The peanut sauce is made of peanut butter and hoisin sauce, flavored with fish sauce and crushed garlic, topped with crushed roasted peanut. It is served with fresh vegetables such as lettuce, julienned pickled vegetables like carrots and white radishes, and fresh herbs like mint and basil.

 can be served as a main course dish on top of rice noodles, as in  [lit.

The deliciousness of nem nướng depends on the accompanying bowl of soy sauce, which is also considered the secret of each restaurant. The bowl of soy sauce with all the attractive flavors of sour, salty and sweet is made from more than 20 spices according to each chef's own heirloom secret. The main ingredients can include sticky rice, soybeans, tomatoes, shrimp, lean meat, pureed pork liver mixed with sugar, garlic, chili, and other ingredients.

Raw vegetables are served depending on the season, depending on the taste of each person that chooses.

See also
 Nem (disambiguation)
 
 List of meatball dishes
 List of Vietnamese dishes
 Vietnamese cuisine
 Brochette
 Chuanr
 Kkochi
 Kushiyaki

References

External links
  Version by Emeril Lagasse on US Food Network.
 http://vietspices.blogspot.ca/2010/10/nem-nuong-vietnamese-grilled-pork.html
 http://wanderingchopsticks.blogspot.com/2007/04/nem-nuong-and-nem-nuong-cuon-vietnamese.html
 By Uyen Thy's Bếp Nhà Ta Nấu (in Vietnamese) (from SBTN)
 More Nem nướng cooking videos 
 (in Vietnamese)
 (in Vietnamese)

Appetizers
Meatballs
Vietnamese pork dishes